Mathigiri is a neighborhood in Hosur in Krishnagiri district in the Indian state of Tamil Nadu.

Demographics
As of the 2001 census of India, Mathigiri had a population of 8,049. Males constituted 51% of the population and females 49%. Mathigiri has an average literacy rate of 71%, higher than the national average of 59.5%. Average male literacy rate is 76%, while average female literacy rate is 65%. 14% of the population is under 6. Mathigiri merged with Hosur Corporation in 2015.

References

Cities and towns in Krishnagiri district